The meridian 99° west of Greenwich is a line of longitude that extends from the North Pole across the Arctic Ocean, North America, the Pacific Ocean, the Southern Ocean, and Antarctica to the South Pole.

The 99th meridian west forms a great circle with the 81st meridian east.

From Pole to Pole
Starting at the North Pole and heading south to the South Pole, the 99th meridian west passes through:

{| class="wikitable plainrowheaders"
! scope="col" width="120" | Co-ordinates
! scope="col" | Country, territory or sea
! scope="col" | Notes
|-
| style="background:#b0e0e6;" | 
! scope="row" style="background:#b0e0e6;" | Arctic Ocean
| style="background:#b0e0e6;" |
|-
| 
! scope="row" | 
| Nunavut — Meighen Island
|-
| style="background:#b0e0e6;" | 
! scope="row" style="background:#b0e0e6;" | Peary Channel
| style="background:#b0e0e6;" |
|-
| style="background:#b0e0e6;" | 
! scope="row" style="background:#b0e0e6;" | Hassel Sound
| style="background:#b0e0e6;" |
|-
| 
! scope="row" | 
| Nunavut — Ellef Ringnes Island
|-
| style="background:#b0e0e6;" | 
! scope="row" style="background:#b0e0e6;" | Unnamed waterbody
| style="background:#b0e0e6;" |
|-
| 
! scope="row" | 
| Nunavut — Ricards Island and Bathurst Island
|-valign="top"
| style="background:#b0e0e6;" | 
! scope="row" style="background:#b0e0e6;" | Parry Channel
| style="background:#b0e0e6;" | Passing just west of Young Island, Nunavut,  (at ) Passing just east of Hamilton Island, Nunavut,  (at )
|-
| 
! scope="row" | 
| Nunavut — Russell Island, Mecham Island and Prince of Wales Island
|-
| style="background:#b0e0e6;" | 
! scope="row" style="background:#b0e0e6;" | Larsen Sound
| style="background:#b0e0e6;" |
|-
| style="background:#b0e0e6;" | 
! scope="row" style="background:#b0e0e6;" | Victoria Strait
| style="background:#b0e0e6;" |
|-
| 
! scope="row" | 
| Nunavut — King William Island
|-
| style="background:#b0e0e6;" | 
! scope="row" style="background:#b0e0e6;" | Queen Maud Gulf
| style="background:#b0e0e6;" |
|-
| 
! scope="row" | 
| Nunavut — O'Reilly Island
|-
| style="background:#b0e0e6;" | 
! scope="row" style="background:#b0e0e6;" | Queen Maud Gulf
| style="background:#b0e0e6;" |
|-valign="top"
| 
! scope="row" | 
|-valign="top"
| 
! scope="row" | 
| North Dakota South Dakota — from  Nebraska — from  Kansas — from  Oklahoma — from  Texas — from 
|-valign="top"
| 
! scope="row" | 
| Tamaulipas Nuevo León — from  Tamaulipas — from  San Luis Potosí — from  Hidalgo — from  State of Mexico — from  Hidalgo — from  State of Mexico — from  Mexico City — from  Morelos — from  Puebla — from  Guerrero — from 
|-
| style="background:#b0e0e6;" | 
! scope="row" style="background:#b0e0e6;" | Pacific Ocean
| style="background:#b0e0e6;" |
|-
| style="background:#b0e0e6;" | 
! scope="row" style="background:#b0e0e6;" | Southern Ocean
| style="background:#b0e0e6;" |
|-
| 
! scope="row" | Antarctica
| Unclaimed territory
|-
|}

See also
98th meridian west
100th meridian west

w099 meridian west